Felipe Menezes Jácomo (born 20 January 1988), known as Felipe Menezes, is a Brazilian professional footballer who plays for Gama as an attacking midfielder.

Club career
Menezes played youth football with Goiás Esporte Clube. He made his senior debut with the local club on 12 May 2007, in a 0–2 away defeat against São Paulo FC for the Série A. On 7 July, for the same competition, he scored his first goals as a professional, netting twice – including once in the 90th minute – in a 3–2 home victory over Sport Club do Recife.

On 28 August 2009, Menezes signed with S.L. Benfica in Portugal, on a five-year contract. He made his official debut for the Lisbon outfit on 17 September, playing 60 minutes in a 2–0 home win against BATE Borisov for the season's UEFA Europa League, but appeared in only 11 official games in his first year as Benfica won the national championship after five years, including just five in the league (133 minutes of action).

On 21 June 2011, Menezes was loaned to Botafogo de Futebol e Regatas for one year.

On 2 July 2013, Menezes signed a three-year contract with Brazilian side Palmeiras. According to the player: "Acredito que eu esteja um pouco atrás fisicamente do pessoal que iniciou esta intertemporada, pois venho fazendo apenas academia e ergometria. Mas eu creio que rapidamente já estarei com o grupo." ("I believe that I am worst physically than the other players, because I am training only at gym and on treadmill. But I think to be soon with the group").

Personal life
Menezes' younger brother, Matheus, is also a footballer. A defender, he also represented Goiás and Botafogo. Menezes' lackluster performances during his tenure at Palmeiras made him a constant target of the fans' complaints. He was nicknamed "Sleep Menezes" due to his rather slow style of play.

Club statistics

Honours
Benfica
Primeira Liga: 2009–10
Taça da Liga: 2009–10, 2010–11

Palmeiras
Campeonato Brasileiro Série B: 2013

Goiás
Campeonato Goiano: 2015

References

External links

Globo Esporte profile 

1988 births
Living people
Brazilian footballers
Association football midfielders
Campeonato Brasileiro Série A players
Campeonato Brasileiro Série B players
Goiás Esporte Clube players
Botafogo de Futebol e Regatas players
Sport Club do Recife players
Primeira Liga players
S.L. Benfica footballers
Sociedade Esportiva Palmeiras players
Brazilian expatriate footballers
Expatriate footballers in Portugal
Sportspeople from Goiânia